Eduardo L. Joson (1919–1990) was a captain of Filipino guerrillas during the Japanese occupation of the Philippines during World War II. He later became the governor of the Nueva Ecija province in the Philippines from 1959 to 1990, making him the second longest serving politician serving one government position in the Philippines for a span of 31 years.

World War II
Joson was the captain of Squadron 213 of Robert Lapham's guerrilla fighters in the Philippines. Along with Captain Juan Pajota, they led the Philippine guerillas during the Raid at Cabanatuan supporting the Alamo Scouts, the largest rescue of prisoners of war in US military history.

Politics and legacy
After the war, Joson took part in helping rebuild the infrastructure of the Philippines. He was subsequently elected as the governor of Nueva Ecija, the same province in which the raid took place. He served from 1959 to 1990. Joson conceived the idea of a capitol building in Palayan City which was finally established and opened on January 25, 2002, by his son, Tomas N. Joson who also became the governor of the province in 1992 and served until 2007 together with his cousin who was then his executive adviser, Julio M. Mercado after his term as vice mayor. On August 5, 2004, a hospital was dedicated in his honor and college was also named after him. It was then announced that their descendants Edward Joson and Julio Jose G Mercado will continue the legacy of former governor Eduardo (Tatang) Joson and pass on to their children.

See also
Raid at Cabanatuan
The Great Raid

External links
US Pacific Command
Nueva Ecija Journal

1919 births
1990 deaths
Governors of Nueva Ecija
Filipino guerrillas
People from Nueva Ecija